Sean Faris (born March 25, 1982) is an American actor and model. He is known for his roles as Jake Tyler in Never Back Down, Kyo Kusanagi in The King of Fighters, and Rick Penning in Forever Strong. He also played Tom in Ghost Machine.

Early life
Faris was born on March 25, 1982, in Houston, Texas, the son of Katherine and Warren Stephen Faris. 
His family was working-class and lived in a small house in Houston; he moved to Ohio at age 12, where he attended Barbizon Modeling and Acting School in Cleveland. In 1999, Faris competed at the International Model and Talent Association.

Career
Faris has starred in many different projects, including two television shows, Life as We Know It, and Reunion, both canceled before the end of their first season. He also played William Beardsley in Yours, Mine & Ours.
Faris also appeared in Sleepover with Alexa Vega in 2004. Faris was also nominated for the Young Actors Award at the 7th Annual Young Hollywood Awards in 2004. In 2007, Faris returned to work on three back-to-back films, Forever Strong, Never Back Down, and Brooklyn to Manhattan. Never Back Down was released on March 14, 2008, with the other two films also opening in 2008.

In 2008, he produced and starred in a short film called Manifest Destiny.
In 2010, Faris appeared in three episodes of the TV show The Vampire Diaries. He also appeared on the cover of the January/February issue of U.S. Men's Health Magazine, and was the highest selling issue of the magazine in 2010. In early 2011, he co-starred in the CBS film The Lost Valentine, opposite Betty White and Jennifer Love Hewitt. 
On March 22, 2013, it was announced that Faris would portray Pennsylvania State Police Officer Gabriel Holbrook on Pretty Little Liars.

In 2011, Faris voiced the character Jack Rourke in the 2011 video game Need for Speed: The Run. On February 25, 2014, it was reported that Faris had landed one of the lead roles in Supernatural: Bloodlines, a spin-off of the CW series Supernatural, with the twentieth episode of the latter's ninth season airing as a backdoor pilot. However, the pilot was not picked up as a series for the 2014–15 season.

Personal life
On September 5, 2017, Faris and actress Cherie Daly announced that they had married during that year's Burning Man festivities. In November 2021, they announced on Instagram that they were expecting their first child.

Filmography

Film

Television

Video games

Awards and nominations

Notes

References

External links
 
 

1982 births
21st-century American male actors
American male film actors
American male television actors
Living people
Male actors from Cleveland
Male actors from Houston
Male models from Texas